Starring Julia is a 2012 Lebanese short film written and directed by Elie Fahed. The short film premiered at the Beirut International Film Festival in 2012 where it got the Orbit Special Jury Prize, and traveled the world after it, taking part in the Baghdad International Film Festival, Menar Film Festivalin Bulgaria, Mizna's 8th Twin Cities Arab Film Festival, FICMEC 5th edition, Notre Dame University – Louaize International Film Festival, Outbox Film Festival, and won the "Best Student Short Film" award at the Monaco Charity Film Festival in 2013.

Plot
The short film tells the story of Julia, a 70 year old woman, who lives in Beirut with her husband Milad, one day, while coming back home from the groceries shopping, she stumble upon a casting call ad on the street, which awakened her lifetime dream of being an actress.

Cast

Production
Elie Fahed wrote the script of Starring Julia during his bachelor degree years at the Lebanese University - Fine Arts Institute in Beirut, the script took around 9 months to be completed and another 3 months to find the right cast to play Julia.

The short film was completely financed by Fahed, and premiered at the Beirut International Film Festival. The film was Elie Fahed's directorial debut.

Reception

Critical reception
The film toured to three countries, starting from its country of release Lebanon, then to Bulgaria, USA, Monaco and it was very well received by the press, as it took part of the “Must see short films at the Outbox Film Festival” list by Beirut.com.

Accolades

References

External links
 

2012 films
Lebanese short films
2010s Arabic-language films
2012 short films